Mandavi is a surname. Notable people with the surname include:
Bhima Mandavi (died 2019), Bharatiya Janata Party politician
Manoj Singh Mandavi (1964–2022), Indian politician
Mohan Mandavi (1957), Indian politician

Hindustani-language surnames
Surnames of Hindustani origin